Mexican National Time Trial Championship decides the national time trial champion of Mexico.

Multiple winners

Men

Women

Men

Elite

U23

Women

Elite

References

National road cycling championships
Cycle racing in Mexico